TelevisaUnivision (formerly known as Univision Communications) is a Mexican-American media company headquartered in New York and Mexico City, which owns the American Spanish language broadcast network Univision as well as free-to-air channels in Mexico such as Las Estrellas, Canal 5, Foro and Nu9ve alongside a collection of pay-tv channels and production studios. 45% of the company is held by the Mexican telecommunications and broadcasting company Grupo Televisa, which was a major programming partner for Univision until the company sold their content assets to Univision in 2022.

Since its founding in the early 1960s as Spanish International Network (SIN), the nation's first Spanish language television network, the company has catered to Hispanic and Latino Americans. It is currently a multimedia conglomerate, with broadcast cable, digital and audio networks, including 65 television stations, online and mobile apps and products.

History

They consolidated the operations of some independent Latino stations into a network. In 1987, Nicholas sold his part of the company to Hallmark Cards, and the name was changed to its current one.

From September 1996 to April 2007, Univision Communications Inc. traded in the New York Stock Exchange under the symbol UVN.

In 2001, Univision Communications Inc. acquired USA Broadcasting, the station group of USA Networks, which included 13 full-power television stations. Most of these stations became part of a new network called TeleFutura, which it launched in 2002, now UniMás. Others joined Univision. In 2003, Univision completed the acquisition of Hispanic Broadcasting Corporation to form Univision Audio Network.

Prior to 2007, its headquarters was in the Century City neighborhood of Los Angeles.

In March 2007, Univision Communications was sold to Broadcasting Media Partners, a group which included Madison Dearborn Partners, Providence Equity Partners., TPG Capital, L.P., Thomas H. Lee Partners, and Saban Capital Group.

In May 2008, Univision Music Group was sold to Universal Music Group and combined with its Latin label to become Universal Music Latin Entertainment.

In 2009, Univision Interactive Media was formed to house Univision.com, Univision Móvil, and an array of digital offerings. Univision On Demand also debuted in 2009, through distribution partners. That same year Univision also created Univision Studios, a new production arm focused on producing and co-producing content for the company's platforms.

Randy Falco became Univision's CEO in 2011. Under Falco, the company began to expand its platforms, including launching new cable networks such as Univision Deportes Network and Univision Tlnovelas, as well as English-language properties targeting Hispanic audiences such as Flama (a YouTube channel featuring content aimed towards Hispanic young adults), and Fusion, a news channel operated as a joint venture with Disney–ABC Television Group.

On January 7, 2013, TeleFutura rebranded as UniMás.  In May 2013, Univision announced an investment in Robert Rodriguez's new English-language cable channel El Rey Network.

In 2014, UCI launched Univision Mobile, La Fabrica and TheFlama.com and also continued to increase the reach of Univision Deportes, Fusion and El Rey. Also in 2014, UCI expanded its partnership with Hulu, building on its launch as the first Spanish-language offering on Hulu in 2012.

On August 16, 2016, Univision Communications purchased Gawker Media for $135 million. The sale included six Gawker blogs – Kotaku, Jalopnik, Lifehacker, Gizmodo (and its sub-site io9), Deadspin and Jezebel – but not the flagship Gawker site, which would be shut down in late August. On September 21, 2016, the Gawker Media assets acquisition was completed and said assets were moved to Gizmodo Media Group.

On May 30, 2018, Vincent Sadusky, formerly of Telemundo and the local station groups LIN Media and Media General, was appointed the new CEO of Univision, replacing the outgoing Randy Falco. Under Sadusky, the company began to backpedal on its attempts to diversify into English-speaking markets, electing to focus more on its core Spanish-language properties targeting Hispanics. As part of this effort, Gizmodo Media Group was divested to private equity firm Great Hill Partners in April 2019.

On July 20, 2019, Univision rebranded its Univision Deportes Network cable channel as TUDN, as part of a collaboration with its content partner Televisa.

On February 25, 2020, investment firms ForgeLight (launched by founder & CEO & ex-Viacom CFO Wade Davis) and Searchlight Capital agreed to acquire the 64% controlling stake in the company that was held by its investment group ownership, while minority owner Televisa would continue to hold its 36% stake. As a result, the company would be led by Davis as CEO, eventually replacing incumbent CEO Vincent Sandusky. The sale was completed on December 29, 2020. On April 13, 2021, Televisa announced that it would sell its content assets to Univision. The new company would be known as TelevisaUnivision. As part of the transaction, Televisa kept the company's technological, pay television assets and their station licenses for the company's four networks. The merger was approved by Mexican Instituto Federal de Telecomunicaciones (IFT) on September 15, 2021, and later by the US Federal Communications Commission on January 24, 2022, with the transaction completed on January 31 of the same year.

In February 2022, TelevisaUnivision announced ViX, a streaming platform featuring both an ad-supported and a subscription tier, with an intended rollout of the AVOD tier set for March 31, 2022.

in May 2022, TelevisaUnivision announced it will acquire the American OTT streaming service, Pantaya from Hemisphere Media Group. Hemisphere will also acquire Univision's radio stations in Puerto Rico.

Properties
TelevisaUnivision's portfolio of properties consists of broadcast, cable, and digital networks. TelevisaUnivision's properties also include consumer products and brand licensing.

Television 
TelevisaUnivision provides programming throughout Mexico through four networks, and in the United States via Univision and UniMás through local affiliates. 253 Mexican local television stations (54.8% of the total commercial stations), and 59 US local television stations air programming from all six terrestrial networks.

The six terrestrial networks are:

TelevisaUnivision beams its terrestrial brands to affiliates. Some of its Mexico-based affiliates are owned by its parent Televisa through Televisa Regional network, airing a mixture of Televisa programming and regional programming from all four Mexico-based terrestrial networks. Foro is the only network that only has one full-time affiliate, XHTV, but some of Foro's programming can be found on most Televisa Regional television stations.

Programming

Cable
TelevisaUnivision also operates a subsidiary called Televisa Networks (often recognized within the entertainment industry by its previous moniker, Visat). This subsidiary is responsible for the distribution of TelevisaUnivision Mexico programs by satellite. It is Televisa Networks that distributes the Las Estrellas signal through satellite to Europe, Australia, and New Zealand. As of 2019, the subsidiary is currently known as Televisa Internacional with Televisa Networks being folded into the company's international division. Other channels under the Televisa Networks umbrella include:
 Adrenalina Sports Network – channel focused on the UFC (exclusive distribution across Latin America)
 Bandamax – a Banda, Norteño and Regional Mexican music station
 De Película (HD) – Mexican film channel
 De Película Clásico – Mexican film channel focused in old films
 Distrito Comedia – Focuses on Televisa produced sitcoms and comedy shows from the 1970s to the present. Before 1 October 2012, it was known as Clásico TV – and focused on showing popular TV shows from the past century, such as sitcoms and children shows
 Golden and Golden Edge (HD) – film channel, showcasing Hollywood blockbusters and other films
 Golden Premier – film channel, showcasing films premiered after 2011
 Las Estrellas Internacional (HD) – international version of the Mexican network, available only outside Mexico (particularly Europe, Australia, and New Zealand)
 Telehit Música – a Spanish language music videos station focused on tropical music (salsa, bachata, reggaeton, etc.)
 TUDN (HD) – sports channel that is often distributed in premium cable services. Shows European soccer leagues (France and Spain) and tournaments of sports not so popular in Mexico. (available only in Mexico, Central America, and Dominican Republic)
 TeleHit (HD) – music channel that regularly airs pop music videos and adult comedy shows
 Telemundo Internacional – shows telenovelas, programs, news and more originally from Telemundo. (available as a Televisa channel only inside Mexico).
 BitMe – its broadcasting started after the closure of its predecessor channel Tiin. It focuses on video games and anime, it has an agreement with Toei Animation as well as with Sentai Filmworks to distribute their anime.
 TLN (TLNetwork) – shows telenovelas and TV series in Portuguese. (available only in Angola, Brazil, Portugal and Mozambique)
 Tlnovelas (HD) – a network devoted to classic telenovelas (soap operas)
 Telenovela Channel – an English-dubbed telenovela channel in the Philippines; network owned by Beginnings at Twenty Plus, Inc. with the partnership of Televisa. The channel operates 24/7
 Unicable – features programming by Univision and original productions
 Univision Latin America – features programming from Televisa and Univision

Featured Channels
 Telemundo Latin America – features programming by Telemundo (exclusive distribution rights only in Mexico)

It operated Galavisión Europa, featuring programming by Televisa and Univision, the channel name was changed in 2006 to Canal de las Estrellas (and later Las Estrellas in 2016), and broadcasts to Europe, Australia, and New Zealand.

Aside from Televisa Networks, TelevisaUnivision also operates US-based cable channels:

 Univision Tlnovelas (Telenovelas)
 Galavision Network

Radio
 Uforia Audio Network (58 local radio stations)

Digital properties
 Se Habla USA
 Univision.com and Univision app
 Uforia Música app
 TUDN app
 Noticias Univision app
 Univision/Univision Now App
 La Fabrica UCI (digital content house)
Blim TV App
ViX (formerly PrendeTV)
Pantaya streaming service

Consumer brands, products, and other services
 Univision Contigo: Univision's social impact / community empowerment brand
 Univision Farmacia
 Univision Mastercard prepaid card
 Simplemente Delicioso
 Telenovelas
 TUDN 
 Despierta América
 Nuestra Belleza Latina
 Antahkarana
 Nmás

Other properties
Entravision Communications (10%)

Former assets

Divested
 El Rey Network
 Gawker Media/Gizmodo Media Group
 Univision Music Group

Dormant or shuttered
 Fusion Media Group
 Fusion TV

TelevisaUnivision-owned television stations in the United States
Notes:
 (**) – Indicates a station owned by TelevisaUnivision prior to the formation of Univision Communications in 1992.
 (++) – Indicates a station owned by USA Broadcasting prior to its acquisition by Univision in 2001.

Footnotes:
1 These stations are owned by Univision, but are operated by Entravision Communications under local marketing agreements.
2 WQHS is the only network-owned station bordering Canada. It is also one of only two stations near the Canada–US border. The other station, KUNS-TV in Seattle, Washington, is third-party owned. However, neither the network nor either of the two stations are available on cable or satellite in Canada due to foreign broadcast restrictions established by the Canadian Radio-television and Telecommunications Commission (CRTC).
3 WSTE was taken over by Univision in 2002, but this was via WLII's local marketing agreement with Siete Grande Television (and in turn Univision's LMA with Raycom until 2005). Univision bought WSTE outright in 2007.
4 KUTH is owned by Univision, but was operated by Equity Media Holdings under a local marketing agreement until Univision took full control of the station in 2009.
5 KNIC is the only station to be built and signed-on by Univision Communications.
6 Station that were owned by Univision but operated by Entravision until Univision took full control of the stations in January 2022.

Former Univision-owned stations

Awards
Univision and its executives have been recognized for their news, entertainment, humanitarian efforts and sports.

Univision News has been recognized with the Peabody, Walter Cronkite and Gracies awards for its special “Entre el abandono y el rechazo”; the King of Spain International (Digital) Journalism Award for “Niños de la Frontera” part of Univision Noticia's La Huella Digital; and GLAAD Media Awards in the categories Outstanding Local TV Journalism for “Cobertura de Spirit Day” by Noticias 34 (KMEX-Univision 34) and Outstanding Documentary for “Identidad sin fronteras” part of Panorámica, a Univision/Pivot co-production. The Radio & Television News Association of Southern California (RTNA) also recognized Univision Noticias with eight Golden Mikes including the top honor, Broadcast Legend Award to Univision News anchor María Elena Salinas. Univision News anchor Jorge Ramos, described as “one of the most aggressive and influential newsmen in America” by Michael Scherer in his profile of Ramos published November 20, 2014, was named to the 2015 TIME 100, the magazine's annual list of the 100 most influential people in the world.

Univision's former president and CEO, Randy Falco, has been recognized by National Academy of Television Arts & Sciences (NATAS) with Board of Trustees’ Award and by Kids in Need of Defense (KIND), with a Champion Award. Univision is also the recipient of ReadyNation's 2015 Business Champion for Children Award. The company's social impact initiative Univision Contigo has been recognized with a variety of awards, including Cynopsis Social Good Awards for its 2016 Vote For Your America campaign and its ongoing early childhood development initiative, Pequeños y Valiosos.

Univision's sports network, Univision Deportes (TUDN) is recipient of two Sports Emmy Awards for Outstanding Live Sports Coverage in Spanish: 2014 FIFA World Cup and Outstanding Studio Show in Spanish: Fútbol Central by the National Academy of Television Arts & Sciences (NATAS); additionally, UDNs’ President Juan Carlos Rodriguez has been bestowed the Sports Network Executive of the Year Navigator Award by Cynopsis, while UDN accepted awards in the categories ‘Tech Innovation’ and ‘Best Spot Over:30.’

See also

 List of telenovelas of Univision

References

External links
 Univision website
 TelevisaUnivision Corporate website

 
Televisa subsidiaries
Mass media companies of the United States
Spanish-language broadcasting in the United States
Cable network groups in the United States
Owned-and-operated television stations in the United States
Companies based in Los Angeles
Entertainment companies based in California
American companies established in 1962
Entertainment companies established in 1962
Mass media companies established in 1962
1962 establishments in California
Madison Dearborn Partners companies
TPG Capital companies
Companies formerly listed on the New York Stock Exchange
1996 initial public offerings
2007 mergers and acquisitions
2022 mergers and acquisitions
Companies based in New York City
American subsidiaries of foreign companies